Sepia trygonina, the trident cuttlefish, is a species of cuttlefish in the genus Sepia from the Red Sea and the western Indian Ocean. Cuttlefish are a specific type of cephalopod that is a highly evolved branch of the Mollusca phylum. They are characterized by having a calcareous shell that is covered by a membrane with free fin lobes that are laterally placed on both sides of their head. They have a centered beak that is used for feeding which is surrounded by 10 appendages. The trident cuttlefish are carnivores that prey on fish, crustaceans, and shellfish. They are also a major source of food for larger marine life like dolphins, seals, and even birds.

Description
It is characterized by 10 appendages, two tentacles and eight arms that surround the mouth, which are covered in suckers. The difference between arms and tentacle clubs are that tentacles are an elongated arm that ends in a point, while tentacle clubs are a long appendage that has a rounded end. On its tentacle clubs, it has 8 different suckers in distinct rows and then 5 larger sized ones. Some of the arms have a hollowed-out section that replaces suckers. Their legs are placed below their eyes and are held together like a swimming keel. They also have free fins on their head, which are used to maneuver the cuttlefish in the water in whichever way they choose. They are able to propel themselves through the water by pumping water through and out of a siphon in their body. The eyes are covered with a transparent membrane and false eye lids. Their eyes are laterally placed, which allow them to see 177 degrees and use binocular vision to help them hunt and camouflage. They contain only one set of gills. This cuttlefish can be recognized by its small body, slender tentacles, and lanceolate, or leaf-like, shape.

There are some characteristic differences between male and female trident cuttlefish, especially in their arms. For males, one set of their arms are significantly shorter than the others. Additionally, the suckers are in rows of four on their tentacles. In female cuttlefish, the suckers on two pairs of arms are in rows of four. Then on the other pair of arms, the suckers are in rows of four only on the distal third of the arms. Additionally, the area that surrounds the cuttlefish’s beak, called the buccal membrane, is covered with longitudinal ridges. Overall, the female trident cuttlefish is generally larger than the male.

Distribution
Sepia trygonina is known from the Indian Ocean, including the Saya-de-Malha Bank, region of the Mascarene Ridge and Zanzibar, the Red Sea, the Persian Gulf and southern India.

Habitat
The trident cuttlefish occurs at depths of 20 to 410 m. Just like other cephalopods, all cuttlefish go through vertical migration. During the day, they will be at depths around 400m or more and then will travel to up to around 20m or shallower during the night.

Fisheries
This species is an occasional catch for trawlers in India, but is listed as heavily exploited by native fishermen in Yemen.

Camouflage 
The trident cuttlefish is able to change the color of its skin in 270-730 milliseconds in response to what is going on around them in their environment. They do this by the use of chromatophores, which are organs in their skin that are used for pigmentation. They are able to respond to any conflicting patterns on either side of their body and will replicate those conflicting patterns on their body. They do this by their laterally placed eyes that can see the surrounding environment on either side of them. They also seem to favor their right eye over their left for adjusting camouflage patterns on their body. Then, they use their left eye to scan their surroundings for any potential predators. The trident cuttlefish will camouflage in the presence of absence of any predators.

References

Cuttlefish
Molluscs described in 1884